Liridon Krasniqi (born 1 January 1992) is a professional footballer who plays as an attacking midfielder for Malaysia Super League club Terengganu, on loan from Johor Darul Ta'zim. Born in Kosovo, he represents the Malaysia national team.

Krasniqi made his senior debut with Mladá Boleslav in 2011 before signing for Turkish club Ankaraspor two years later. He did not make any appearances for the team, and was loaned to the TFF First League side Fethiyespor for the 2013–14 season. In 2015, Krasniqi joined Malaysian side Kedah, winning the 2016 Malaysia Cup and 2017 Malaysia FA Cup during his four-year spell with the club. After a brief spell with Melaka United, he signed for defending Malaysia Super League champions Johor Darul Ta'zim in 2020.

Internationally, Krasniqi has represented Albania at the youth level and Kosovo at the senior level, appearing in the nation's first international match against Haiti in 2014. He switched his international allegiance to Malaysia in 2020 after staying in the country for five years, and made his Malaysia debut in 2021.

Club career

Early career and Mladá Boleslav
Krasniqi was part of 1. FC Nürnberg's youth team until 2009, when he was transferred to the Czech side Slavia Prague. On 2 March 2011, Krasniqi signed a contract until the end of the season with the Czech First League club Mladá Boleslav. He played his first and only match on 14 May 2011 in a 2–1 home defeat against Jablonec after coming on as a substitute in the 69th minute in place of Ondřej Kúdela.

Ankaraspor and loan to Fethiyespor
On 29 July 2013, Krasniqi signed a three-year contract with the TFF First League club Ankaraspor. Two days later, he was loaned to fellow TFF First League club Fethiyespor. Eighteen days later, he made his debut in a 3–2 away defeat against 1461 Trabzon after being named in the starting line-up.

Kedah
On 9 April 2015, Krasniqi joined Malaysian Premier League side Kedah. Eight days later, he made his debut against Negeri Sembilan and scored his side's second goal during a 2–1 home win. With Kedah, Krasniqi won the 2016 Malaysia Cup and 2017 Malaysia FA Cup.

Melaka United
On 19 January 2019, Krasniqi joined Malaysian Super League side Melaka United. Fourteen days later, he made his debut against Petaling Jaya City after being named in the starting line-up and scored his side's first goal during a 2–1 home win.

Johor Darul Ta'zim
On 20 December 2019, Krasniqi joined Malaysian Super League side Johor Darul Ta'zim. On 28 February 2020, he made his debut in a 1–0 home win against his former club Kedah after coming on as a substitute in the 89th minute in place of Leandro Velázquez.

Loan to Newcastle Jets
On 5 February 2021, Krasniqi joined A-League side Newcastle Jets, on a season-long loan. On 13 March 2021, he made his debut in a 2–1 away defeat against Sydney FC after coming on as a substitute in the 85th minute in place of Angus Thurgate.

Loan to Odisha
On 23 August 2021, Krasniqi joined Indian Super League side Odisha, on a season-long loan. He made his league debut on 24 November in a 3–1 win against Bengaluru FC.

Loan to Khon Kaen United
In August 2022, Krasniqi moved to Thai League 1 side Khon Kaen United on a year-long loan. However, his loan ended early as Krasniqi returned to Johor in January 2023.

Loan to Terengganu
On 12 February 2023, Krasniqi officially joined fellow Super League side Terengganu on loan for the 2023 Malaysia Super League season.

International career

Albania and Kosovo
Krasniqi was part of the Albanian under-21 team, making one appearance in a friendly match against Israel in March 2011. Three years later, he received a call-up from Kosovo for their first official international match against Haiti, and made his senior Kosovo debut after coming on as a substitute in the 71st minute in place of Ardian Gashi.

Malaysia
On 3 February 2020, the Football Association of Malaysia announced that Krasniqi had received Malaysian citizenship after staying in the country for almost five years, becoming eligible for the Malaysian national team. On 10 May 2021, he received a call-up from Malaysia for the friendly match against Bahrain and the 2022 FIFA World Cup qualification matches against the United Arab Emirates, Vietnam and Thailand. Eighteen days later, Krasniqi made his debut in a friendly match against Bahrain after being named in the starting line-up.

Career statistics

Club

International

Scores and results list Malaysia's goal tally first, score column indicates score after each Krasniqi goal.

Honours
Mladá Boleslav
Czech Cup: 2010–11

Kedah FA
Malaysia Premier League: 2015
Malaysia FA Cup: 2017
Malaysia Cup: 2016
Malaysia Charity Shield: 2017

Johor Darul Ta'zim
Malaysia Super League: 2020
Malaysia Charity Shield: 2020

References

External links

1992 births
Living people
People from Viti, Kosovo
Association football midfielders
Malaysian footballers
Malaysia international footballers
Naturalised citizens of Malaysia
Kosovan footballers
Kosovo international footballers
Kosovan expatriate footballers
Kosovan expatriate sportspeople in Germany
Kosovan expatriate sportspeople in the Czech Republic
Kosovan expatriate sportspeople in Turkey
Kosovan expatriate sportspeople in Malaysia
Kosovan expatriate sportspeople in Australia
Albanian footballers
Albania under-21 international footballers
Albanian expatriate footballers
Albanian expatriate sportspeople in Germany
Albanian expatriate sportspeople in the Czech Republic
Albanian expatriate sportspeople in Turkey
Albanian expatriate sportspeople in Malaysia
Albanian expatriate sportspeople in Australia
Malaysian expatriate footballers
Malaysian expatriate sportspeople in India
Malaysian expatriate sportspeople in Thailand
FK Mladá Boleslav players
Ankaraspor footballers
Fethiyespor footballers
Kedah Darul Aman F.C. players
Melaka United F.C. players
Johor Darul Ta'zim F.C. players
Newcastle Jets FC players
Odisha FC players
Liridon Krasniqi
Terengganu FC players
Czech First League players
TFF First League players
Malaysia Premier League players
Malaysia Super League players
A-League Men players
Indian Super League players
Liridon Krasniqi
Expatriate footballers in Germany
Expatriate footballers in the Czech Republic
Expatriate footballers in Turkey
Expatriate footballers in Malaysia
Expatriate soccer players in Australia
Expatriate footballers in India
Expatriate footballers in Thailand
Dual internationalists (football)